Mount Duckabush is a  peak located in Olympic National Park in the Olympic Mountains of Washington state.  The headwaters of the Duckabush River include the northwest slopes of Mount Duckabush.

Climate
Based on the Köppen climate classification, Mount Duckabush is located in the marine west coast climate zone of western North America. Most weather fronts originate in the Pacific Ocean, and travel northeast toward the Olympic Mountains. As fronts approach, they are forced upward by the peaks of the Olympic Range, causing them to drop their moisture in the form of rain or snowfall (Orographic lift). As a result, the Olympics experience high precipitation, especially during the winter months. During winter months, weather is usually cloudy, but, due to high pressure systems over the Pacific Ocean that intensify during summer months, there is often little or no cloud cover during the summer.

See also
List of mountains of the United States
Mount Steel

References

External links
 
 

Mountains of Jefferson County, Washington
Mountains of Washington (state)
Olympic Mountains
Landforms of Olympic National Park